The Ven. John Cranston, D.D. was  Archdeacon of Clogher from 1718 until his death in November 1762.

Cranston was born in County Tyrone in 1687; and educated at Trinity College, Dublin. He wasHe was Prebendary of Tyholland at St Macartan's Cathedral, Clogher from 1716 to 1718; and Rector of Tydavnet from 1720 to 1762.

Notes

Archdeacons of Clogher
18th-century Irish Anglican priests
People from County Tyrone
Alumni of Trinity College Dublin
1762 deaths
1677 births